Filip Blašković (born 5 July 1945) is a Croatian retired football player.

Club career
Nicknamed Šiljo, Blašković started his career with hometown club BSK Slavonski Brod and joined Dinamo Zagreb in 1966, where he formed a formidable tandem with Mladen Ramljak and won the 1967 Inter-Cities Fairs Cup.

International career
He made his debut for Yugoslavia in a September 1969 friendly match against the Soviet Union, coming on as a 30th-minute substitute for Živorad Jevtić. It remained his sole international appearance.

References

External links

Filip Blašković profile at the Serbia national football team website 
Filip Blašković NASL stats
Yugoslav League stats at B92 (copy of former zerodic.com site)

1945 births
Living people
Sportspeople from Slavonski Brod
Association football defenders
Yugoslav footballers
Yugoslavia international footballers
GNK Dinamo Zagreb players
Toronto Blizzard (1971–1984) players
NK Marsonia players
Yugoslav First League players
North American Soccer League (1968–1984) players
Yugoslav expatriate footballers
Expatriate soccer players in Canada
Yugoslav expatriate sportspeople in Canada
Croatian footballers